The IPSC Norwegian Tournament Championship is an IPSC level 3 Tournament Championship held once a year by Dynamic Sports Shooting Norway.

Champions 
The following is a list of current and previous champions.

Overall category

Senior category

See also 
Norwegian Handgun Championship
Norwegian Rifle Championship

References 
 DSSN Hall of Fame
 TriggerFreeze.com - IPSC Rifle Norway

IPSC shooting competitions
National shooting championships
Norway sport-related lists
Shooting competitions in Norway